Erik Thomson is a Scottish-born New Zealand-Australian actor. He is known for playing Hades in the television series Hercules: The Legendary Journeys, Xena Warrior Princess  and Young Hercules, Dr. Mitch Stevens in All Saints and Dave Rafter in Packed to the Rafters.

Thomson won an Australian Film Institute Award for his performance in the Australian feature film Somersault.

Early life
Erik Thomson was born  in Inverness, Scotland, and his family emigrated to New Zealand when he was seven. He studied performing arts at the New Zealand Drama School in Wellington and English Literature and drama at Victoria University of Wellington.

Career
Thomson had a number of television roles in New Zealand, starting with Marlin Bay, a drama set in a casino and resort. He won a wider fan following for his occasional appearances as the god Hades in the series Hercules: The Legendary Journeys and Xena: Warrior Princess Young Hercules, all three series of which were filmed in New Zealand.

In 1995, Thomson moved to Australia and landed regular roles in Pacific Drive, medical series All Saints (1999–2003) and The Alice (2005). He has had guest roles on such series as Wildside and Always Greener. From 2008 to 2013, Thomson played Dave Rafter on the Seven Network dramedy series Packed to the Rafters. From 2015 to 2018 he had the lead role in 800 Words.

Thomson's work in theatre includes roles in Complete Works of Shakespeare, Julius Caesar, Twelve Angry Men, and Angels in America.

Thomson's film credits include the role of soldier Simon Mollison in the 2008 film The Black Balloon with Toni Collette. He appeared in Somersault with Abbie Cornish and Sam Worthington, which scored him an AFI Award, and also featured in Accidents Happen with Geena Davis. Another Thomson role is as Malcom Downer in the 2019 film Storm Boy with Geoffrey Rush, and Finn Little.

Personal life
Thomson has been married to actress Caitlin McDougall since 1999, and the couple have a daughter named Eilish and a son named Magnus.

 they live at Port Willunga, South Australia.

Awards
Thomson won an Australian Film Institute Award for Best Actor in a Supporting Role for his performance in Somersault, and was nominated for his work in The Black Balloon. For television, he has been nominated for a Logie Award five times and has won two Silver Logie for Most Popular Actor.

Awards for Thomson include:

(The Silver Logie for Most Popular Actor was referred to as "Best Actor" in 2016 and 2017)

Filmography

References

External links

 

1967 births
Best Supporting Actor AACTA Award winners
Living people
Logie Award winners
Naturalised citizens of New Zealand
New Zealand expatriates in Australia
New Zealand male television actors
People from Inverness
Scottish emigrants to New Zealand
Scottish expatriates in Australia
Scottish male television actors